Mariana Brito da Cruz Forjaz Secca (born 30 October 1994), known professionally as Maro (stylised in all caps), is a Portuguese singer and songwriter.

Early life and education 
Secca is the second of the three children of João Pedro Basto Forjaz Secca and Cristina Isabel Capello Brito da Cruz. She initially planned to become a veterinarian, but instead chose to pursue a musical career, studying at Berklee College of Music and moving to Los Angeles.

Career 
She has collaborated with Jacob Collier in his Djesse Vol. 2 album and has a presence on YouTube, where she posted videos of herself singing with artists such as António Zambujo, Rosa Passos, Eric Clapton, Mayra Andrade, Salvador Sobral and a plethora of other artists.

She features on the track "Better Now" by American electronic music duo Odesza, the second single from the upcoming album The Last Goodbye. As of April 2022, the song peaked at 19th on the Dance/Electronic Billboard Chart.

Discography

Studio albums
Maro, vol. 1 (2018)
Maro, vol. 2 (2018)
Maro, vol. 3 (2018)
Maro & Manel (with Manuel Rocha) (2018)
It's OK (2018)
Can You See Me? (2022)

EPs
Pirilampo (2021)

Singles
"Midnight Purple" (feat. Nasaya) (2019)
"Why" (feat. Ariza) (2019)
"What Difference Will It Make" (2019)
"Mi condena" (feat. Vic Mirallas) (2020)
"Tempo" (feat. Nasaya) (2021)
"I See It Coming" (feat. Nasaya) (2021)
"Saudade, saudade" (2022)
"Am I Not Enough for Now?" (2022)
"We've Been Loving in Silence" (2022)
"It Keeps on Raining" (2022)
"Like We're Wired" (2022)

As featured artist
"Walk Above the City" (The Paper Kites feat. Maro) (2021)
"Better Now" (Odesza feat. Maro) (2022)
"Lua" (Jacob Collier feat. Maro) (2019)

References 

1994 births
Living people
21st-century Portuguese women singers
Portuguese songwriters
Eurovision Song Contest entrants of 2022
Eurovision Song Contest entrants for Portugal